Pingnan railway or Pinghu–Nanshan railway is a railway line in Shenzhen connecting Pinghu with Nanshan. Freight and long-distance passenger train services are provided.

Route
The line is not electrified, and therefore only diesel locomotives are used on the line.

History
The railway was planned in the late 1980s to provide rail access for the Port of Shenzhen. It was the first railway in the People's Republic of China being built with both local and foreign capital. Construction of the Pingnan railway was approved in 1991 by the Chinese Government and commenced in September that year. In March 1993 part of the route was opened for trial operation. The entire line was opened in September 1994 and included into the national railway network.

Locomotives

 DF11
 DF4B/D
 DF4

Rolling stock

 25G
 25B for temporary services during Spring Festival travel season

Stations

See also
 List of railways in China

References

Railway lines in China
1994 establishments in China
Rail transport in Guangdong
Transport in Shenzhen
Railway lines opened in 1994